Thomas "Tom" Forese (born in Boston, Massachusetts) is an American politician, a Republican, and former chairman of the Arizona Corporation Commission. He was also in the Arizona House of Representatives representing District 17. Forese also previously served consecutively from January 10, 2011, until January 14, 2013, in the District 21 seat.

Education
Forese attended Brigham Young University–Idaho.

Elections
Redistricted to District 17 with fellow incumbent Representative J. D. Mesnard, and with incumbent Democratic Representatives Ed Ableser running for Arizona Senate and Ben Arredondo leaving the Legislature, Forese and Mesnard were unopposed for the August 28, 2012 Republican Primary; Forese placed first with 13,974 votes, and Mesnard placed second; Forese and Mesnard won the four-way November 6, 2012 General election, with Forese taking the first seat with 44,422 votes and Mesnard taking the second seat ahead of Democratic nominee Karyn Lathan and a write-in candidate.

When District 21 incumbent Republican Representative Steve Yarbrough ran for Arizona Senate and Warde Nichols left the Legislature, Forese ran in the three-way August 24, 2010 Republican Primary, placing first with 13,379 votes; in the three-way November 2, 2010 General election, Forese took the first seat with 42,523 votes, and fellow Republican J. D. Mesnard took the second seat ahead of Green candidate Linda Macias.

In 2014, Forese ran for and won a seat on the Arizona Corporation Commission.

On September 14, 2016, Forese announced that he would run for State Treasurer of Arizona in the 2018 elections to succeed incumbent Jeff DeWit, who is not running for reelection. In April 2018, Forese withdrew from the race.

References

External links
 Official page at the Arizona State Legislature
 Campaign site
 

Year of birth missing (living people)
Living people
Brigham Young University–Idaho alumni
Republican Party members of the Arizona House of Representatives
Politicians from Boston
People from Gilbert, Arizona